Mariya Vorona (born 15 November 1983 in Minsk, Belarus) is a Belarusian rower. She competed in the women's quadruple sculls at the 2004 Summer Olympics.

References

Living people
Belarusian female rowers
Olympic rowers of Belarus
Rowers at the 2004 Summer Olympics
1983 births
World Rowing Championships medalists for Belarus